The Light heavyweight competition was the third-heaviest class featured at the 2011 World Amateur Boxing Championships, held at the Heydar Aliyev Sports and Exhibition Complex.

Medalists

Seeds

  Egor Mekhontsev (semifinals)
  Joseph Ward (third round)
  Hrvoje Sep (second round)
  Enrico Kölling (third round)
  Damien Hooper (quarterfinals)
  Kim Hyeong-kyu (second round)
  Elshod Rasulov (semifinals)
  Ramil Aliyev (third round)
  Imre Szellő (second round)
  Yamaguchi Falcao (third round)
  Yahia El-Mekachari (second round)
  Dinesh Kumar (third round)

Draw

Finals

Top half

Section 1

Section 2

Bottom half

Section 3

Section 4

External links
Draw

Light heavyweight